Alan Buzza (born 3 March 1966) is an English former cricketer and rugby union player. He played seventeen first-class matches for Cambridge University Cricket Club between 1989 and 1990. He also played professional rugby for Wasps and toured with the England rugby team in 1993 to Canada, though caps were not awarded for this tour. He was in England's squad for the 1990 Five Nations but remained on the bench.

See also
 List of Cambridge University Cricket Club players

References

External links
 

1966 births
Living people
English cricketers
Cambridge University cricketers
Wasps RFC players
Cricketers from Beverley
Cornwall cricketers
Oxford and Cambridge Universities cricketers
English cricketers of 1969 to 2000